Winai Kraibutr (born June 16, 1969 in Krabi Province) is a Thai actor. He is from Krabi.  He has appeared in a number of films that have achieved significant success at the Thai box office. He is considered a bankable star in Thailand and has achieved minor international exposure through the international release of Bang Rajan. Despite his considerable success in his home country, he has also appeared in a joint Khmer-Thai low-budget film from Cambodia called The Snake King's Child. He graduate bachelor's degree and master from Suannandha Rajabhat

Filmography
Nang Nak, 1999
Bangrajan, 2000, international title: Bang Rajan
Krai Thong, 2001
Kuon puos keng kang, 2001, international title: The Snake King's Child
Immortal Enemy, 2003
Plon naya, 2004, alternative English and international title: Spicy Beauty Queen of Bangkok
Queens of Langkasuka, international DVD title Pirates of Langkasuka, 2008
Yamada: The Samurai of Ayothaya, 2010

External links
 

1969 births
Living people
Winai Kraibutr
Winai Kraibutr
Winai Kraibutr